Merrifieldia innae is a moth of the family Pterophoridae that is found in Lesotho.

References

innae
Endemic fauna of Lesotho
Moths of Africa
Moths described in 2011